The Dyle et Bacalan DB-10 was a heavy night bomber, designed in France and flown in 1926.  It was a twin engine, high wing, metal frame monoplane, distinguished by a very thick centre section wing which formed the forward fuselage and housed the engines.

Design

In 1925 the well-established naval ship builders Société Anonyme de Travaux Dyle et Bacalan, based in Bordeaux, developed an aircraft manufacturing interest.  Their first production was a high wing, twin engine heavy bomber, the DB-10. Like their later aircraft, the DB-10 was structurally an all-metal machine. In most respects the DB-10 was a conventional design for its day but it had one feature, a very thick wing centre section blended into the fuselage, which was also to become a characteristic of later Dyle et Bacalan aircraft.

At the front of the DB-10 the thick aerofoil centre section stretched unbroken between the engines, which were mounted upon it.  Beyond the engines outer wings of normal thickness and constant chord, significantly thinner and narrower than the inboard section, were each supported by a pair of parallel struts to the lower edge of the centre section.  Wing spars and struts were made of steel tubing, with duralumin ribs.   A conventional, rectangular section, fuselage with duralumin longerons emerged from the centre section as the thick aerofoil thinned, carrying a tailplane on its upper surface, braced from below.  It also carried a single fin and a deep rudder, which moved in a cut-out between the elevators.  All surfaces, except those housing the uncowled Gnome-built Bristol Jupiter radial engines, were fabric.  The DB-10 had a fixed, conventional undercarriage with each single, partly cowled, mainwheel mounted on a parallel pair of V-shaped struts behind the engines.  The outer pair of struts was fixed close to the lower ends of the wing struts, at the edge of the thick aerofoil. A tailwheel was mounted  at the rear of the fuselage, just in front of the rudder.

The thick centre section enclosed vertical bomb racks as well as fuel tanks.  Open cockpits for the crew were built on top of it, starting with a navigator/bombardier's or gunner's position at the extreme leading edge.  Immediately behind but stepped above it was the pilot's cockpit, with another cockpit just aft where the raised crew housing ended.  There was a separate dorsal gunner's position, fitted with a gun ring, on the fuselage proper.

Operational history
The DB-10 was entered into the 1926 French government BN3 competition for a new  three man night bomber, held at Villacoublay  where it flew against such aircraft as the Amiot 122, the Farman F.123, the Latécoère 19 and the eventual winner the Lioré et Olivier LéO 20.  Only one DB-10 was built, though the company persisted with the thick wing idea in its later DB-70 transport aircraft.

Specifications

References

External links

The Dyle et Bacalan DB-10 in flight
Dyle et Bacalan DB-10 article in Flight, December 2, 1926, pp. 778-779
 by British Pathé
Technical report on Dyle et Bacalan DB-10 by NACA
 by British Pathé

1920s French bomber aircraft
High-wing aircraft
DB-10
Twin piston-engined tractor aircraft
Aircraft first flown in 1926